South Korea is scheduled to compete at the 2017 World Aquatics Championships in Budapest, Hungary from 14 July to 30 July.

Diving

South Korea has entered 6 divers (two male and four female).

Men

Women

Swimming

South Korean swimmers have achieved qualifying standards in the following events (up to a maximum of 2 swimmers in each event at the A-standard entry time, and 1 at the B-standard):

Men

Women

Synchronized swimming

South Korea's synchronized swimming team consisted of 3 athletes (3 female).

Women

 Legend: (R) = Reserve Athlete

References

Nations at the 2017 World Aquatics Championships
South Korea at the World Aquatics Championships
2017 in South Korean sport